The Mystery is an album by Australian guitarist Tommy Emmanuel that was released in 2006. The album includes the track "Gameshow Rag/Cannonball Rag" which was nominated for Best Country Instrumental Performance at the 49th Annual Grammy Awards. The song won Instrumental of the Year at the 2007 Country Music Awards of Australia.

Reception

Ken Dryden from AllMusic said "This is a pleasant, well-engineered CD, with obvious comparisons in spots to the late Nashville guitar master Chet Atkins."

Fred Kraus from Minor 7th wrote: "Speed, melody, tone, songwriting skill, versatility -- Emmanuel effortlessly displays it all on his 17th collection, The Mystery", adding that "Emmanuel proves skillful without being flashy; calm without being soporific; thoughtful without being pedantic. He remains faithful to the melody, using his exceptional guitar work to support the essence of the song. Very nice stuff."

Track listing

Personnel
Tommy Emmanuel – guitar, vocals
Elizabeth Watkins – vocals
Pamela Rose – harmony vocals

References

2006 albums
Tommy Emmanuel albums
Favored Nations albums